Mui Tsz Lam is the name of several villages in Hong Kong:

 Mui Tsz Lam (North District), in North District
 Mui Tsz Lam (Sha Tin District), in Sha Tin District